The 1974–75 British Home Championship was an international football tournament between the British Home Nations. It resulted in a resounding victory for an England team which was going through one of the worst periods of consistent play in their history. The tournament saw several draws, including two dramatic 2–2 ties for the Welsh team against England and Scotland and a goalless draw between England and Northern Ireland. The Scots had begun better, beating the Irish 3–0 in their second game and so entered the final match with a real chance of victory. The Welsh, like the English, had a 2-point advantage in their final match, but failed to capitalise on this, losing to Northern Ireland and ending in last place. The final game, between England and Scotland was in the end a one-sided affair, the English crushing the Scots in a 5–1 rout and winning the tournament.

Table

Results

References

External links
Full Results and Line-ups

British
British Home Championship
British Home Championships
Brit
Brit
Brit